Robotnik (Polish, 'worker', and Slovak: robotník, 'worker') may refer to:

 Robotnik (1894–1939), a newspaper published by the Polish Socialist Party
 Robotnik (1983–1990), a newspaper published during the period of martial law in Poland
 Doctor Eggman or Doctor Ivo Robotnik, the primary antagonist of the Sonic the Hedgehog video game series
 Gerald Robotnik, grandfather of Doctor Ivo Robotnik
 Maria Robotnik, granddaughter of Gerald Robotnik and cousin of Doctor Ivo Robotnik
 Robotnik Automation, a Spanish robotics company

See also

Robotnikinin
Worker (disambiguation)
Robot (disambiguation)